Game of Love is the sixth studio album by German band Bad Boys Blue. It was released on 29 October 1990 by Coconut Records. The record includes three singles: "How I Need You", "Queen Of Hearts" and "Jungle In My Heart". John McInerney performed all the songs. The album was certified gold in Finland in 1991.

Track listing
"Queen of Hearts" – 4:11   
"Jungle in My Heart" – 3:38   
"I Don't Know Her Name" – 3:23   
"Jenny, Come Home" – 3:49   
"Chains of Love" – 3:46   
"How I Need You" – 3:37   
"I Need a Woman" – 4:12   
"I Don't Wanna Lose You" – 3:13   
"I Am Your Believer" – 3:32   
"Queen of Hearts (Remix)" – 4:16

Personnel
Bad Boys Blue
John McInerney – Lead vocal (all tracks)
Andrew Thomas
Trevor Bannister

Credits
All tracks written by T. Hendrik/K.van Haaren except 1, 10 written by T. Hendrik, Donovan/K.van Haaren
Produced by Tony Hendrik & Karin Hartmann
Additional arrangements and keyboards by Uwe Haselsteiner
Recorded and mixed by Gary Jones at Coconut Studio, Hennef (Germany).

Sales and certifications

References

External links
ALBUM - Game Of Love

1990 albums
Bad Boys Blue albums